Minuscule 802 (in the Gregory-Aland numbering), ε470 (von Soden), is a Greek minuscule manuscript of the New Testament written on paper. Palaeographically it has been assigned to the 14th century. The manuscript has no complex contents, only 24 leaves have survived.

Description 
The codex contains the text of the Gospel of Luke (1:1-6:13), on 24 paper leaves (size ). The text is written in one column per page, 20 lines per page.

Text 
The Greek text of the codex is a representative of the Byzantine text-type. Hermann von Soden classified it to the textual family Kr. Aland placed it in Category V.

According to the Claremont Profile Method it represents the textual family Kr in Luke 1. In Luke 10 and Luke 20 the manuscript is defective.

History 
According to Gregory the manuscript was written in the 14th century. The manuscript is currently dated by the INTF to the 14th century.

According to the subscription it once belonged to "Ananiou Hegoumenou".

It was added to the list of New Testament manuscripts by Gregory (802e). Gregory saw the manuscript in 1886.

The manuscript is now housed at the National Library of Greece (99) in Athens.

See also 

 List of New Testament minuscules
 Textual criticism
 Minuscule 801
 Minuscule 803

References

Further reading

External links 
 Minuscule 802 at the National Library of Greece

Greek New Testament minuscules
14th-century biblical manuscripts
Manuscripts of the National Library of Greece